Chan Kin Lok (born 7 March 1994) is a Hong Kong swimmer. She represented Hong Kong at the World Aquatics Championships in 2013, 2017 and 2019, as well as in the Short Course Worlds in 2012, 2014, 2016, 2018, 2021 and 2022.

Career 

She competed in the women's 50 metre butterfly and women's 4 × 100 metre freestyle relay events at the 2017 Summer Universiade held in Taipei, Taiwan.

In 2018, she won the silver medal in the women's 4 × 100 metre medley relay event at the 2018 Asian Games held in Jakarta, Indonesia. She also won the bronze medal in the women's 4 × 200 metre freestyle relay event.

In 2019, she represented Hong Kong at the 2019 World Aquatics Championships held in Gwangju, South Korea. She competed in the women's 50 metre butterfly and women's 100 metre butterfly events and in both events she did not advance to compete in the semi-finals. She also competed in the women's 4 × 100 metre medley relay event.

References

External links
 

Living people
1994 births
Place of birth missing (living people)
Hong Kong female butterfly swimmers
Hong Kong female freestyle swimmers
Competitors at the 2017 Summer Universiade
Swimmers at the 2014 Asian Games
Swimmers at the 2018 Asian Games
Medalists at the 2014 Asian Games
Medalists at the 2018 Asian Games
Asian Games silver medalists for Hong Kong
Asian Games bronze medalists for Hong Kong
Asian Games medalists in swimming
21st-century Hong Kong women